Somalis in Germany are citizens and residents of Germany who are of Somali descent. According to the Federal Statistical Office of Germany, as of 2016, there are a total 33,900 Somalia-born immigrants living in Germany. Of those, 7,985 individuals were granted asylum status.

History
Between 1969 and 1991, the flow of Somali refugees to Germany was steady, but it increased quickly after 1991. Many of these later arrivals subsequently moved on to other countries, including the United Kingdom. 
UNHCR data suggests that 15,000 people from Somalia claimed asylum in Germany between 1990 and 1999. In March 2019, together with the International Organization for Migration, Germany started to run a resettlement programme for refugees in Ethiopia. A first group of 154 Somali refugees were resettled in Germany under the programme in October 2019.

Social issues
In a BKA report on statistics from 2017, migrants to Germany from Somalia constituted 1.7% of all migrants and 2.9% of all migrant crime suspects.

Female genital mutilation and gender-based violence 
According to the BMFSFJ, of the 5,797 women from Somalia living in Germany in May 2016 without German citizenship, 5,681 (98%) were victims of female genital mutilation.

According to research with 20 Somali refugee women living in shared reception facilities in Germany, many travelled to the country alone, with fear of sexual violence, forced marriage, honor killings or FGM being cited as gender-specific reasons for having fled Somalia.

Radicalization 
In the 2010-2012 Somalia became one of the main jihadi destinations for German foreign terrorist fighters. A significant portion of these Somalis belonged to a group of al-Shabaab sympathizers in Bonn, along with German converts to Islam.

References

Further reading

Somalian diaspora in Europe
Ethnic groups in Germany